Garth Anderson (born 12 March 1976) is a Caymanian footballer who plays as a midfielder. He has represented the Cayman Islands during World Cup qualifying matches in 2004 and 2008.

References

Association football midfielders
Living people
1976 births
Caymanian footballers
Cayman Islands international footballers
George Town SC players